This is a list of publications by Richard Brautigan (1935-1984), an American writer known for his poetry, novels, and short stories.

Poetry collections

Novels
Brautigan published nine novels, a tenth was published after his death, and an eleventh remains unpublished.

 
 
 
 
 
 
 
 
 
 
 Written in 1982 and first published, posthumously, in France in 1994, as Cahier d'un Retour de Troie, published by Christian Bourgois.

Unpublished

Other collections
 
Collection of short stories.
 
Collection of short stories.
 
Materials Brautigan gave to Edna Webster, including stories and poems, published posthumously.

Other media
 
Album recorded at Golden State Recorders in San Francisco, intended for the Beatles Zapple Records (1969) but the label was closed down by Allen Klein.

Contributions to other works
In addition to his own published books, Brautigan's writings have appeared in at least 250 other publications.
In many cases such a work contained the first appearance of one or more poems or stories. An extensive list of these publications can be found on the Brautigan website maintained by John Barber and Robert Nelson.

Translations
Starting in 1967, and continuing on through 2021, translations of Brautigan's writings into other language have been undertaken with great regularity. To date, at least 485 such translations have been published, spanning 40 different languages. An extensive list of these works in translation can be found on the Brautigan website maintained by John Barber and Robert Nelson.

References

Works by Richard Brautigan
Brautigan